The Early Days is the fourth compilation by German hard rock band Bonfire. It was released in 2004 by LZ Records and is a five-part CD set that was initially sold individually and then released as a box set.  The set is a re-release of all the Cacumen material including the "Riding Away" single, the albums Cacumen  and Bad Widow, and the Longing for You EP; the EZ Livin' album, After the Fire; and the Lessmann/Ziller album, Glaub dran. All tracks have been digitally remastered and feature previously unreleased songs.

Track listing
CD #1 - Cacumen

CD #2 - Bad Widow

CD #3 - Down to Hell

CD #4 - After The Fire

CD #5 - Glaub dran

Band members
Claus Lessmann - lead vocals
Hans Ziller - guitars
Uwe Köhler - bass
Jürgen Wiehler - drums

References
 Billboard's Listing of The Early Days album

Bonfire (band) compilation albums
2004 compilation albums